The silver spinyfin (Diretmus argenteus) is a spinyfin of the genus Diretmus, found around the world except the Mediterranean, at depths down to 2,000 m.  It belongs to the monotypic genus Diretmus.  Their length is between 30 and 40 cm.

The silver spinyfin is a widely distributed but rare species with a flattened disc-shaped body with a sharp scute-covered edge on the belly.  A large upturned mouth and huge eye dominate the front half of the disc and a small truncate caudal fin projects from the other.  They are oviparous and the larvae spend time in the plankton.  D. argenteus has 38 opsin genes for the rods in its retinas, suggesting that they can see in color in very low light conditions. The silver spinyfin has the highest number of  visual opsins of any vertebrate according to a research study.

It has small spiny scales but no lateral line and is a uniform silvery colour, the top of the back being black.

References

 
 
 Tony Ayling & Geoffrey Cox, Collins Guide to the Sea Fishes of New Zealand,  (William Collins Publishers Ltd, Auckland, New Zealand 1982) 

silver spinyfin
Cosmopolitan fish
silver spinyfin
silver spinyfin